Gunter Trojovsky is a retired West German slalom canoeist who competed in the late 1960s. He won a silver medal in the K1 team event at the 1967 ICF Canoe Slalom World Championships in Lipno.

References

German male canoeists
Living people
Year of birth missing (living people)
Medalists at the ICF Canoe Slalom World Championships